

Events

June events 
 June 23 – Robert Stephenson, his father George Stephenson, Edward Pease and Michael Longridge form Robert Stephenson and Company in Newcastle upon Tyne, England, to build steam locomotives.

Births

September births 
 September 27 – Frederick H. Billings, president of Northern Pacific Railway 1879–1881, is born (d. 1890).

December births 
 December 28 – Thomas Alexander Scott, president of Union Pacific Railroad 1871–1872 (d. 1881).

Deaths

References